The Animal Welfare Act is one of several laws in different countries, including:

 The Animal Welfare Act 1999 in New Zealand
 The Animal Welfare Act of 1966 in the US
 The Animal Welfare Act 2006 in the UK